The 1971 Middle Tennessee Blue Raiders football team represented Middle Tennessee State University—as a member of the Ohio Valley Conference (OVC) during the 1971 NCAA College Division football season. Led by second-year head coach Bill Peck, the Blue Raiders compiled a record an overall record of 7–4 with a mark of 5–2 in conference play, tying for second place in the OVC. The team's captains were Jim Inglis and Danny Buck.

Schedule

References

Middle Tennessee
Middle Tennessee Blue Raiders football seasons
Middle Tennessee Blue Raiders football